15α-Hydroxydehydroepiandrosterone, abbreviated as 15α-hydroxy-DHEA or 15α-OH-DHEA, is an endogenous metabolite of dehydroepiandrosterone (DHEA). Both 15α-OH-DHEA and its 3β-sulfate ester, 15α-OH-DHEA-S, are intermediates in the biosynthesis of estetrol from dehydroepiandrosterone (DHEA).

See also
 16α-Hydroxydehydroepiandrosterone
 16α-Hydroxyandrostenedione
 16α-Hydroxyestrone

References

Androstanes